John Melvin "Moose" Myers (October 8, 1924 – December 24, 2020) was an American football player, coach, and college athletics administrator.  He played college football at the University of California, Los Angeles (UCLA) and professionally in National Football League (NFL) with the Philadelphia Eagles and Los Angeles Rams. Myers served as the head football coach at the University of the Pacific in Stockton, California from 1953 to 1960, compiling a record of 39–33–5. He was also the athletic director at Pacific from 1956 to 1961.

Myers attended high school in Ventura, California, and served in the United States Navy as an ensign during World War II. Myers first came to Pacific in 1951 for one season as the backfield coach for the Tigers before returning to the NFL as a player in 1952.

Myers died on December 24, 2020, at the age of 96. At the time of his death, he was the last surviving member of both the 1948 and 1949 Philadelphia Eagles championship teams.

Head coaching record

References

External links
 

1924 births
2020 deaths
American football fullbacks
American football quarterbacks
Los Angeles Rams players
Pacific Tigers athletic directors
Pacific Tigers football coaches
Philadelphia Eagles players
UCLA Bruins football players
United States Navy officers
United States Navy personnel of World War II
People from Ventura, California
Sportspeople from Ventura County, California
Coaches of American football from California
Players of American football from California
Players of American football from St. Louis
Military personnel from California